Rikke Dybdahl (born 21 July 1997) is a Danish footballer who plays as a forward for Fortuna Hjørring and for the Denmark women's national under-23 football team.

Club career
Dybdahl has previously played for Thisted FC until 2013 and then signed with Team Viborg. In 2014, she joined Vildbjerg SF, where she played four years until 2018. In 2018, she signed a contract with FC Thy-Thisted Q and since the move to the club, she has been an important player with big responsibility.

The same season, as she moved to FC Thy-Thisted Q the club promoted to the Elitedivisionen league, were they placed 4th in their first season.

In the 2019–20 season, she is currently the fourth most scoring player in the Elitedivisionen, with 9 goals. On 9 December 2022, her transfer to Fortuna Hjørring was announced.

International career
She has appeared for the Danish national youth team and Danish national junior team, several times. In 2019, she made her debut for the Denmark women's national under-23 football team, against Netherlands.

References

External links
 
 

1997 births
Living people
Danish women's footballers
Denmark women's international footballers
Women's association football forwards
FC Thy-Thisted Q players
People from Lemvig
Sportspeople from the Central Denmark Region